Herbert Weir Smyth (August 8, 1857 – July 16, 1937) was an American classical scholar. His comprehensive grammar of Ancient Greek has become a standard reference on the subject in English, comparable to that of William Watson Goodwin, whom he succeeded as Eliott Professor of Greek Literature at Harvard University.

Life
He was educated at Swarthmore (A.B. 1876), Harvard (A.B. 1878), Leipzig, and Göttingen (Ph.D. 1884). From 1883 to 1885, he was instructor in Greek and Sanskrit at Williams College, and then for two years, he was reader in Greek at Johns Hopkins. From 1887 to 1901, he was professor of Greek at Bryn Mawr. In the latter year, he was called to Harvard as professor of Greek and in 1902, and he was appointed Eliott professor of Greek literature, succeeding Goodwin. From 1899 to 1900, he was professor of the Greek language and literature at the American Classical School at Athens. From 1889 to 1904, he was secretary of the American Philological Association and editor of its Transactions and in 1904 was elected president. He became a fellow of the American Academy of Arts and Sciences, a member of the American Philosophical Society and vice-president of the Egypt Exploration Society.

Works
 The Dialects of North Greece (1887)
 The Sacred Literature of the Jains (1894, a translation)
 Sounds and Inflections of Greek Dialects I: The Ionic Dialect (Clarendon Press, 1894)
 Greek Melic Poets (McMillan, 1900)
 Beginner's Greek Book (1906) (with Allen Rogers Benner; American Book Company 1906)
 A Greek Grammar for Schools and Colleges (1916)
 Greek Grammar for Colleges (American Book Company, 1920)
 Aeschylean Tragedy (the second Sather Lecture in 1924)
 Aeschylus (Loeb edition)
 "The Greek Language in its Relation to the Psychology of the Ancient Greeks" (read before the Congress of Arts and Sciences at the St. Louis Exposition in 1904)
 "Aspects of Greek Conservatism" (in Harvard Studies in Classical Philology, 1906)
 "Greek Conceptions of Immortality from Homer to Plato" (in Harvard Essays on Classical Subjects, 1912)

He was editor of the Greek Series for Colleges and Schools (20 volumes).

Sources

Further reading
"Herbert Weir Smyth." Ward W. Briggs, Jr., Biographical Dictionary of North American Classicists (Westport/London 1994) 602–604.

External links
 
 
 Herbert Weir Smyth, Greek Grammar at the Christian Classics Ethereal Library

American classical scholars
American philologists
1857 births
1937 deaths
Swarthmore College alumni
Harvard University alumni
Williams College faculty
Classical scholars of Harvard University
University of Göttingen alumni
Leipzig University alumni
Classical scholars of Bryn Mawr College
Classical scholars of Johns Hopkins University
Grammarians of Ancient Greek
Scholars of ancient Greek literature
Linguists from the United States